The Camden 28 is a 2007 documentary film about twenty-eight members of the "Catholic Left" who were arrested in 1971 for attempting to break into and vandalize a draft board in Camden, New Jersey. Because the Camden 28 were not militant and did not plant bombs like the Weathermen, they provided a much greater threat to the U.S. government: the growing religious opposition to the Vietnam war could not be written off as extremist, so they had to be brought down.

The Camden 28 was written, directed, and produced by Anthony Giacchino. In 2007, it was aired as part of PBS's Point of View series. The film was met with high critical praise and received an 88% "Fresh" rating on Rotten Tomatoes and a WGA Award nomination for Best Documentary Screenplay.

See also
The Camden 28 - article on the group

References

External links
 Official Site
 
 The Camden 28 on Rotten Tomatoes
 P.O.V. The Camden 28 - PBS's site dedicated to the film

2007 films
American documentary films
POV (TV series) films
Documentary films about the Vietnam War
Documentary films about United States history
2007 documentary films
Anti-war films about the Vietnam War
Films about activists
Camden, New Jersey
Documentary films about New Jersey
2000s English-language films
2000s American films
English-language documentary films